Football Club Aregno Calvi is a French association football club. They are based in the town of Calvi, Haute-Corse and their home stadium is the Stade Faustin Bartoli. As of the 2012–13 season, they play in the Championnat de France amateur Group A.

Current squad 
 Goalkeepers
 Jacques André Luciani		09/06/1989	FRA	Bastia (20)
 Florent Menozzi		17/07/1979	FRA	Bastia (20)
 Défenders
 Jean Dominique Ciavaldini		27/02/1980	FRA	Bastia (20)
 Yoann Daniel Cirne Lemos		26/02/1988	FRA	Marseille (13)
 Yves Gentili		30/05/1989	FRA	Ajaccio (20)
 Nicolas Martinetti		01/01/1989	FRA	Ajaccio (20)
 Dominique Menozzi		04/08/1974	FRA	Marseille (13)
 Grégory Richier		06/03/1985	FRA	Nice (06)
 Midfielder
 Jérôme Bérardi		29/01/1979	FRA	Marseille 4e (13)
 Vincent Giannone		07/01/1989	FRA	Bastia (20)
 Nicolas Gomes		01/12/1986	FRA	Bastia (20)
 Olivier Oggiano		19/11/1992	FRA	Porto Vecchio
 Jean Marc Sauli		27/05/1978	FRA	Bastia (20)
 Thierry Ventura		23/01/1990	FRA	Bastia (20)
 Attacker
 Dimitri Lesueur          25/01/1987      FRA     FC Istres 
 Franck Muller		02/08/1982	FRA	Lyon 4e (69)
 Jonathan Portillo		18/02/1989	FRA	Lormont (33)
 Rosthan Rafai		03/04/1986	FRA	Nice (06)
 Sylvain Reynouard		28/02/1985	FRA	Aubenas (07)
 Thierry Ricco		30/09/1974	FRA	Bastia (20)
 Malik Tchokounte		11/09/1988	FRA	Nice (06)
 Entraîneur' : Didier Santini

Notable players
 Walter Bakouma
 Nicolas Martinetti
 François Orsini
 Simon Perrin

External links
FCA Calvi official website 

 
Football clubs in Corsica
Sport in Haute-Corse
1953 establishments in France
Association football clubs established in 1953
Football clubs in France